Art is a Business is a conceptual project by the artist Alexey Parygin, realized in the first half of the 2000s. Art is a Business is the artist’s second philosophical manifesto, after Contemplation of Money.

History

The art project was based on the 312/20 performance publicly shown on January 21, 2001 in the performance program at the Petersburg Festival in the Manege Central Exhibition Hall (Saint Petersburg).

In the authentic version, the performance text chanted for twenty minutes in two voices (high female and low male) consisted of three hundred and twelve rhythmically repeating verses turning into a looped Dadaist mantra.

This endless repetition made the reasonable formula meaningless, gradually turning it into a simple sequence of sounds, depriving it of any specific speculative sense. The verbal leitmotif changed the performance direction initially stated as an absolute given. Slogan and march were replaced with psychedelic rap. Art is business, but becoming utilitarian and flat, commercial and applicable, it, like a phoenix destroying itself with fire, is able to rise from the ashes, melt down and be reborn into something completely different, filled with new living energy.

By means of art, the Contemplation of Money and Art is a Business projects portrayed money as a New Divine Essence.

Major work
 Art is a Business/ Business ist Kunst. 2015, Five compositions, 150 X 120 cm (each), canvas on stretcher, acrylic, mixed media.
 312/20 Performance. 2001.

Works

Artist's book
 Alexey Parygin Solar System Art. — St. Petersburg, 2015. — 12 p. Circulation — 8 copies numbered and signed by the author.
 Alexey Parygin Искусство это Бизнес / Business is an Art. — St. Petersburg, 2015. — 12 с. Circulation — 6 copies numbered and signed by the author.
 Alexey Parygin ИББИ. — St. Petersburg, 2015. — 12 p. Circulation — 6 copies numbered and signed by the author.
 Alexey Parygin Искусство это бизнес. Бизнес это искусство. — St. Petersburg, 2001. — 6 p. Circulation — 50 copies numbered and signed by the author.
 Alexey Parygin 312/20 (Искусство это бизнес. Бизнес это искусство). — St. Petersburg, 2000. — 12 p. Circulation — 25 copies numbered and signed by the author.

Separate copies of the artists' books are in the following collections: Van Abbemuseum (Eindhoven), State Museum of V.V. Mayakovsky (Moscow), Russian State Library (Moscow), Russian State Art Library (Moscow), Latvian National Museum of Art (Riga), Anna Akhmatova Literary and Memorial Museum (Saint Petersburg), Scientific Library of the Russian Academy of Arts (Saint Petersburg), Artist's Book Museum (Moscow).

Books

Exhibitions
 Искусство/Бизнес. — Space on Malaya Posadskaya. Institute of Human Philosophy of the Herzen University. — St. Petersburg. September 12—October 22, 2022.
 Современный миф — Персональный миф / Вторая Балтийская биеннале искусства книги. — Anna Akhmatova Literary and Memorial Museum. St. Petersburg. August 10—September 4, 2016.
 Искусство это бизнес / Бизнес это искусство. — Nevsky 20 (rotunda). — St. Petersburg. June 17—July 17, 2015.
 2-я Независимая международная биеннале графики. St. Petersburg: Manege Central Exhibition Hall. June 25—July 19, 2004.
 Петербург 2000. St. Petersburg: Manege Central Exhibition Hall. January 8—28, 2001.
 Искусство — это бизнес. St. Petersburg: Manege Central Exhibition Hall. 2000.

Bibliography

Articles
 Parygin A. B. Искусство это бизнес-проект // Economics vs Art: 10th Annual International Conference of the Center for the Study of Economic Culture of St Petersburg State University. — St. Petersburg: Asterion, 2022. — 92 p. — P. 49-51.  (RUS)
 Parygin A. B. Искусство — это бизнес (авторский комментарий к проекту). — St. Petersburg art notebooks, # 68, St. Petersburg: AIS, 2022. — P. 248-254.  (RUS)
 Grigoryants E. I. «Книга художника»: традиции и новации // «Искусство печатной графики: история и современность». В сб. н. статей по материалам научной конференции Четвертые казанские искусствоведческие чтения. November 19-20, 2015. — Kazan: The State Museum of Fine Arts of the Republic of Tatarstan, 2015. — P. 83-86, ill. (RUS)
 Parygin A. B. Искусство это бизнес Бизнес это искусство/ Exhibition booklet. — St. Petersburg. — 2015.
 Blagodatov N. Art is a search, search is an art // St. Petersburg: Neva, No. 2, 2002. — P. 253—255. (RUS)

Exhibition catalogues
 Parygin A. B. Искусство это бизнес / Бизнес это искусство (exhibition booklet). — St. Petersburg. — 2015. (RUS)
 Бойс, Йозеф Бойс — мой Бойс (exhibition catalog). Auth. introductory article: I. Vvedensky. Rostov-on-Don, 2014. — 60 p., color. ill. — P. 20-21. (RUS)
 Kunst ist Geschäft / Die Verwandlung. 25 Jahre russische Künstlerbücher 1989-2013. LS collection Van Abbemuseum (exhibition catalog). Auth. introductory article: Antje Theise, Klara Erdei, Diana Franssen. Eindhoven, 2013. — 120 p., color. ill. — P. 64-65. 
 Петербург 2000. Auth. introductory article: L. Skobkina. St. Petersburg: Manege Central Exhibition Hall. — 2001. — 63 p., ill. (RUS)

References

Minimalism
Conceptual art